National Water Resources Institute is the Nigerian research institution responsible for the training of water resources engineers.

Background 
The institute was established under the National Water Resources Institute Act, Cap N83 LFN 2004.

In 2018, a three-member committee was set up by the Minister for Water Resources, Suleiman Hussein Adamu, to assess the effects of flood in Jigawa State.

In 2019, the Nigerian Defence Academy signed an MOU with the National Water Resources Institute for an exchange of scholars and joint research on water resources and its various applications.

In 2021, WaterAid partnered with the National Water Resources Institute for training and sanitation programs in the country.

References

See also 

 National Water Research Institute

Water management
Research institutes in Nigeria
2004 establishments in Nigeria